Rathlin O'Birne (Gaeilge: Reachlainn Uí Bhirn) is an island located to the south west of the district of Glencolumbkille, County Donegal, Ireland, and 2 km west of Malin Beg.

Lighthouse
Rathlin O'Birne lighthouse went into operation on 14 April 1856. In 1974, a Radioisotope thermoelectric generator was installed, making it home to Ireland's first nuclear powered lighthouse.
 However, by 1987, the power output of the RTG had dwindled to an insufficient level and the lighthouse was converted to wind power, which was in use until 1991, at which point it was converted to solar power.

A road, with a cut stone wall on both sides, runs from the beach to the lighthouse to protect the lighthouse keepers as they made their way across the island.

Accidents
On 7 January 1975, the trawler Evelyn Marie sank on the west side ("the rock") of Rathlin O Birne with the loss of 6 crew.
A year later, in November 1976, the trawler Carrig Una sank in the same spot with the loss of 5 crew.
In July 2017, two men died when their RIB ran out of fuel close to the shore of Rathlin O'Birne, after having been rescued from the same area four weeks prior.

References

Islands of County Donegal
Uninhabited islands of Ireland